Lucius Morris Beebe (December 9, 1902 – February 4, 1966) was an American writer, gourmand, photographer, railroad historian, journalist, and syndicated columnist.

Early life and education
Beebe was born in Wakefield, Massachusetts, to a prominent Boston family. He attended both Harvard University and Yale University, where he contributed to the campus newspaper, Harvard Crimson, and the humor magazine, The Yale Record. During his tenures at boarding school and university, Beebe was known for his numerous pranks. One of his more outrageous stunts included an attempt at festooning J. P. Morgan's yacht Corsair III with toilet paper from a chartered airplane. His pranks were not without consequence, and he proudly noted that he had the sole distinction of having been expelled from both Harvard and Yale, at the insistence, respectively, of the president and dean. Beebe earned his undergraduate degree from Harvard in 1926, only to be expelled during graduate school.

Journalist
During and immediately after obtaining his degree from Harvard, Beebe published several books of poetry, but eventually found his true calling in journalism. He worked as a journalist for the New York Herald Tribune, the San Francisco Examiner, the Boston Telegram, and the Boston Evening Transcript, and was a contributing writer to many magazines such as Gourmet, The New Yorker, Town and Country, Holiday, American Heritage, and Playboy. Beebe re-launched Nevada's first newspaper, the Territorial Enterprise, in 1952.

He wrote a syndicated column for the New York Herald Tribune from the 1930s through 1944 called This New York.  The column chronicled the doings of fashionable society at such storied restaurants and nightclubs as El Morocco, the 21 Club, the Stork Club, and The Colony. Beebe is credited with popularizing the term "cafe society", which was used to describe the people mentioned in his column.

In 1950, Beebe and his long-time romantic partner, photographer Charles Clegg, moved to Virginia City, Nevada, where they purchased and restored the Piper family home and later purchased the dormant Territorial Enterprise newspaper. The newspaper was relaunched in 1952, and by 1954 had achieved the highest circulation in the West for a weekly newspaper. Beebe and Clegg co-wrote the That Was the West series of historical essays for the newspaper.

In 1960, Beebe began work with the San Francisco Chronicle, where he wrote a syndicated column, This Wild West.<ref name=Pen>The Provacative Pen of Lucius Beebe, Esq., p. vii.</ref> During the six years that he wrote the column, Beebe covered such topics as economics, politics, journalism, religion, history, morals, justice, finance, and travel.

Gourmand
Beebe was a noted gourmand. He had his own column, Along the Boulevards,  in Gourmet, and wrote extensively for Holiday and Playboy about restaurants and dining experiences around the world. Some of the restaurants he covered include The Colony, The Stork Club, The Pump Room, the 21 Club, Simpson's-in-the-Strand, and Chasen's. Also a wine aficionado, he was a member of the Confrérie des Chevaliers du Tastevin.

Author
In addition to his work as a journalist, Beebe wrote over 35 books. These dealt primarily with railroading and café society. He was the first writer to use a painting by Howard L. Fogg, noted railroad artist, on the cover of a book. Many of his railroad books were written with his longtime companion Charles Clegg.

Beebe was inducted into the Nevada Writers Hall of Fame in 1992.

Railroad history
Beebe wrote extensively about the joys of train travel, including such nostalgic books describing quaint short line railroads as Mixed Train Daily (1947) and Narrow Gauge in the Rockies (1958). In September, 1947, he arranged an excursion on the Maryland and Pennsylvania Railroad covered by a photo spread in Life. Beebe and Clegg were attired in formal wear and top hats, as waiters served champagne and caviar to their guests riding in an open car behind an ancient steam locomotive. Beebe's book The Trains We Rode (1965) used more than 1,500 photos and illustrations to chronicle the passing era of famous named passenger trains and streamliners, along with the stations they served. For example, he proclaimed Baltimore's Mount Royal Station, built in the early 1890s, as "one of the celebrated railroad stations of the world, ranking in renown with Euston Station, London, scene of so many of Sherlock Holmes' departures, the Gare du Nord in Paris, and the feudal fortress of the Pennsylvania Railroad at Broad Street, Philadelphia."

Along with Clegg, Beebe owned two private railcars, the Gold Coast and The Virginia City. The Gold Coast, Georgia Northern / Central of Georgia No. 100, was built in 1905 and is now at the California State Railroad Museum. After Beebe and Clegg purchased The Virginia City, they had it refurbished and redecorated by famed Hollywood set designer Robert T. Hanley in a style known as Venetian Renaissance Baroque. Beebe in the Virginia City  The Virginia City has been restored and currently operates as an excursion car. Beebe and Clegg wrote about and photographed the Virginia & Truckee Railroad and worked unsuccessfully with other railroad fans to preserve it. Their fame was such that they were caricatured in "Fiddletown & Copperopolis," by Carl Fallberg.

Ship travel
Beebe was a noted partisan of the Cunard Line and passenger liner travel in general. He wrote several articles about trans-Atlantic passage on Cunard ships during the "Golden Era" of the 1920s, 30s and 40s.

Sartorial splendor
A noted boulevardier, Beebe had an impressive and baroque wardrobe. Beebe's clothing included 40 suits, at least two mink-lined overcoats, numerous top hats and bowlers, a collection of doeskin gloves, walking sticks and a substantial gold nugget watch chain. Columnist Walter Winchell referred to Beebe and his wardrobe as "Luscious Lucius". Beebe's sartorial splendor was recognized when he appeared in full formal day attire on the cover of Life over the title of "Lucius Beebe Sets a Style". 

Many of Beebe's articles and columns addressed men's traditional fashion. He was especially fond of English bespoke tailoring and shoes and wrote glowing articles about noted court tailor Henry Poole & Company and noted bootmaker John Lobb, whom he patronized on a regular basis. He also liked ties, particularly from Charvet in Paris, men's hats and wrote of the history of the bowler hat.

Personal life
In 1940, Beebe met Charles Clegg while both were houseguests at the Washington, D.C., home of Evalyn Walsh McLean. The two soon developed a personal and professional relationship that continued for the rest of Beebe's life. Previously, Beebe had been involved with society photographer Jerome Zerbe.

The pair initially lived in New York City, where both men were prominent in café society circles. Eventually tiring of that social life, the two moved in 1950 to Virginia City, Nevada, a tiny community that had once been a fabled mining boomtown. There, they reactivated and began publishing the Territorial Enterprise, a fabled 19th-century newspaper that had once been the employer of Mark Twain. Beebe and Clegg shared a renovated mansion in the town, traveled extensively, and remained prominent in social circles.

Beebe was a community activist while living in Nevada. He was appointed by Nevada's governor to be a member of the Nevada State Centennial Committee (1958) and was Chairman of the Silver Centennial Monument Committee, groups that planned events honoring Nevada's and Virginia City's history. Through their efforts, the federal government commissioned a commemorative stamp in recognition of the discovery of the Comstock Lode in the Virginia City region.

Clegg and Beebe sold the Territorial Enterprise'' in 1961 and purchased a home in suburban San Francisco. They continued the writing, photography, and travel that had marked their lives until Beebe's death. Beebe died at the age of 63 of a sudden heart attack at his winter home in Hillsborough, California, (near San Francisco) on Friday, February 4, 1966. A memorial service was held three days later, on Monday, February 7, at 11:00 a.m. at Emmanuel Church on Newbury Street in Boston. His ashes, reportedly along with those of two of his dogs, were returned to Massachusetts and are buried in Lakeside Cemetery on North Avenue in his hometown of Wakefield, in one of the Beebe family plots, at the extreme north end of the cemetery.

Clegg committed suicide in 1979, at the same age that Beebe had reached when he died.

Bibliography

References

Further reading

External links 
 
 Piper Beebe House 
 California State Railroad Museum
 Territorial Enterprise
 Beebe Life Cover Photo
 Nevada Writers Hall of Fame

American food writers
20th-century American photographers
Harvard University alumni
New York Herald Tribune people
American people in rail transportation
1902 births
1966 deaths
The Yale Record alumni
20th-century American historians
American gay writers
Rail transport writers
LGBT people from Massachusetts
20th-century American male writers
American male non-fiction writers
Historians from New York (state)
20th-century American LGBT people